Eugoa bipunctalis is a moth of the family Erebidae first described by van Eecke in 1926. It is found on Sumatra, Java and Borneo. The habitat consists of lowland dipterocarp forests and lower montane forests.

References

Moths described in 1926
bipunctalis